There are two species of lizard named Reeves's butterfly lizard:

 Leiolepis reevesii, endemic to Asia
 Leiolepis rubritaeniata, native to Thailand, Laos, Cambodia, and Vietnam